NGC 2503 is an isolated spiral galaxy approximately 254 million light-years away in the constellation Cancer. The galaxy was discovered on February 17, 1865 by astronomer  Albert Marth.

See also
 List of NGC objects (2001–3000)

References

External links 
 
 seds.org
 SIMBAD astronomical database

Spiral galaxies
Cancer (constellation)
2503
22453
4158
Astronomical objects discovered in 1865
Field galaxies